The cinnamon myotis (Myotis fortidens) is a species of vesper bat. It is found in Guatemala and Mexico.

References

Mouse-eared bats
Bats of Central America
Bats of Mexico
Least concern biota of North America
Taxonomy articles created by Polbot
Taxa named by Gerrit Smith Miller Jr.
Mammals described in 1928